CDBurnerXP is an optical disc authoring utility for Windows 2000 and later, written mostly in Visual Basic .NET as of version 4, released in September 2007. It has international language support. The software is available to download in both 32-bit and 64-bit variants.

The program supports burning data on CD-R, CD-RW, DVD-R, DVD-RW, DVD+R, DVD+RW, Blu-ray Disc and HD DVD as well as burning audio files (WAV, MP3, MP2, FLAC, Windows Media Audio, AIFF, BWF (Broadcast WAV), Opus, and Ogg Vorbis in the Red Book format. ISO images can also be burnt and created via the program, along with UDF and/or ISO-9660 formats. Bootable data discs are also supported.  

CDBurnerXP is freeware but closed source because it uses some proprietary libraries. The standard CDBurnerXP installer comes bundled with installCore but an installer without it can be downloaded. There are also versions for the x64 platform, a Windows Installer-based version for deployment via corporations and a portable version for putting onto USB or other types of media.

References

External links
 

Optical disc authoring software
Windows-only freeware
Windows CD/DVD writing software